Victor Bivol (born 15 July 1977) is a Moldovan judoka. He finished in joint fifth place in the lightweight (73 kg) division at the 2004 Summer Olympics, having lost the bronze medal match to Leandro Guilheiro of Brazil.

Achievements

References
 Yahoo! Sports

External links
 

1977 births
Living people
Moldovan male judoka
Judoka at the 2000 Summer Olympics
Judoka at the 2004 Summer Olympics
Olympic judoka of Moldova
Universiade medalists in judo
Universiade bronze medalists for Moldova
Medalists at the 1999 Summer Universiade
21st-century Moldovan people